Donegal County Museum is a county museum in County Donegal in Ireland. Located on the High Road in Letterkenny, the museum building first opened to the public in 1845 as the Warden's House of the Letterkenny Workhouse. The building was repurposed as a museum in the late 20th century.

The purpose of Donegal County Museum is to "collect, record, preserve, and display the material evidence and associated information of the History and Heritage of County Donegal". In 2013, the then Minister for Arts, Heritage and the Gaeltacht, Jimmy Deenihan, said that the museum was among the "best in Ireland" at "dealing with the past and recognising all traditions [and diversity]".

History

Workhouse
The museum was originally housed in what was once the warden's house of the 19th century Letterkenny Workhouse.

The minutes of the first meeting held by Letterkenny Board of Guardians in July 1841 record that a decision has been taken to build a workhouse in Letterkenny. The new workhouse was designed by George Wilkinson. The Cork firm of Alex Deane was contracted to build it for £5,792. The flag stone for the floors was bought from Lord Abercorn's Quarry for 20p per sq. yard.

In early 1842 the work commenced on building of the Letterkenny Workhouse. It occupied a six-acre site and could accommodate 500 inmates. The final cost of the building was £6,450 plus £1,475 for fixtures and fittings. 
It was declared fit for the admission of paupers on 16 December 1844, and admitted the first inmates  on 14 March 1845– before the Famine began.
The first Workhouse Master and Clerk was George Langan. His wife Anne Lane became the Matron. Jane Thompson was the School Mistress. 
During the famine, temporary sheds were erected to accommodate fever patients. 
In the 1901 census, the population of the letterkenny Union was 13,080 with 6 officials and 79 inmates in the workhouse. 
The Workhouse later became the Letterkenny District Hospital, Fever Hospital, Births deaths and Marriages and other purposes. A dispensary was attached to the workhouse and later became Saint Anne's Maternity Hospital. The Workhouse building was demolished  to build the Letterkenny Garda HQ. 
The Master's house/Entrance Block is now home to Donegal County Museum.

Museum opening
The Donegal County Museum first opened to the public in 1987. It received additional European Union funding in 1989.

Between 1990 and 1991, the existing building underwent renovations and an extension was built. The extended museum was officially opened by President Mary Robinson on 14 June 1992.

Later developments
Further renovations was carried out between 1999 and 2000, and in 2019 a new multi-functional space was opened. The museum converted an existing museum workshop into a space to accommodate a range of public events and activities, such as educational workshops, meetings, film screenings and lectures. These works were part funded through the Arts and Culture Capital Scheme 2016-2018 under the Department of Culture, Heritage and the Gaeltacht.

Contents
The role of Donegal County Museum is to collect, record, preserve, communicate and display for the use and enjoyment of the widest community possible, the material evidence and associated information of the history of County Donegal. In Ireland, an official "County Museum" is one that is operated and funded by a Local Authority. Donegal County Museum is one of thirteen local authority-operated County Museums in Ireland.

The museum holds a collection of original artefacts that have a connection to County Donegal. These items cover subjects such as archaeology, history, social history and folklife.

The first floor exhibition tells the story of Donegal from prehistory to the twentieth century. Temporary exhibitions covering a range of topics and are held in the ground floor gallery throughout the year. The Museum is opened year round and is admission free.
 
In November 2022, it launched a database of Donegal who died in World War I.

Designated Museum
Donegal County Museum is a "Designated Museum" which, under the National Monuments (Amendment) Act, 1994, and the National Cultural Institutions Act, 1997, is entitled to retain objects on behalf of the state. All archaeological objects found with no known owner belong to the state, and if the object is primarily of local importance it may be kept in Donegal County Museum for educational or display purposes.

References

1987 establishments in Ireland
Buildings and structures in Letterkenny
History of Letterkenny
Local museums in the Republic of Ireland
Museums established in 1987
Museums in County Donegal